Starlite  Ferries is a passenger ferry company based in Batangas City, Batangas, Philippines owned and operated by Chelsea Logistics Holdings Corp., a Manila-based logistics company. It mainly serves the provinces of Batangas, Oriental Mindoro, Romblon, Aklan, Cebu and Surigao del Norte and is one of the leading ferry companies operating in the Mimaropa and Western Visayas regions.

History

Starlite Ferries Inc. started operations in 1995 with its first vessel MV Starlite Ferry. It began at a time when trade and commerce in Mindoro started to flourish. MV Starlite Ferry served the Calapan to Batangas route which then had daily average passenger traffic of 10,000 people and an average vehicle count of 1,500 to 2,000 units. There was an increasing demand for sea transportation of the people of Mindoro and Starlite was the first to respond to this challenge.

In September 2017, Chelsea Logistics Holdings Corp. (CLC), a logistics company owned by Filipino entrepreneur Dennis Uy under Udenna Corporation, acquired Starlite Ferries, Inc. from the Cusi family. Uy also owns  Philippine interisland ferry companies Supercat Fast Ferry Corporation and Trans-Asia Shipping Lines.

In August 2018, Starlite Ferries became the first Philippine ferry company to operate branches of the Japanese convenience store FamilyMart. Four of the company's RORO ferries, MV Starlite Pioneer, MV Starlite Jupiter, MV Starlite Pacific and MV SWM Salve Regina each opened a FamilyMart store onboard. The first three ferries operate along the Batangas-Calapan route while the last ferry operates along the Batangas-Caticlan route. The opening of the convenience stores follows Starlite Ferries owner Dennis Uy's acquisition of the Philippine franchise of FamilyMart.

Routes
, Starlite Ferries serve the following destinations:

Fleet

Starlite Ferries currently has a fleet of 12 RORO ferry, most of which are refurbished after 20–30 years of service in Japan. In 2015, it added to its fleet the brand-new flagship MV Starlite Pioneer, built by Kegoya Dock Co., Ltd. The acquisition of the new ship is part of a fleet upgrade composed of 10 vessels and financed by the Philippine Business Bank.

 A new vessel will join the fleet and will be named as MV Starlite Phoenix. She is the former MV Trans-Asia 20 of Trans-Asia Shipping Lines and will be transferred to Starlite Ferries fleet. The vessel is also the sister ship of MV Starlite Venus.
† - Former vessel; sank in 2016 (see below)

Incidents and accidents
 On December 26, 2016, MV Starlite Atlantic sank off the coast of Tingloy, Batangas during the onslaught of Typhoon Nina (international name: Nock-ten). The vessel was anchored in Batangas Bay when the typhoon passed over it with winds of up to 185 km/h in the center and gusts of 215 km/h. The typhoon generated huge waves between six to eight meters in height, causing the vessel to come off its mooring and drift toward Tingloy where it sank. One person died and 18 were reported missing in the incident, while the Philippine Coast Guard rescued 15 out of the 34 crew.

References

External links
Official Website
Starlite Ferries on Facebook

Ferries of the Philippines
Ferry companies of the Philippines
Passenger ships of the Philippines
Shipping companies of the Philippines
Transportation in Mindanao
Companies based in San Juan, Metro Manila